Joe Gibbs born Joel Arthur Gibson (14 October 1942 – 22 February 2008) was a Jamaican reggae producer.

Biography
Born in Salt Spring, St. James in 1942, Joe Gibbs studied electronics in Cuba and went on to work as an electronic technician for Stone and Webster in Montego Bay. He moved to Kingston where he set up an electrical repair shop in Beeston Street, with television repairs and sales as its main concern. It was in this shop that he first started to sell records. The fast growth of the local music scene encouraged him to get more involved in the music business, and in 1966 he started to record some artists in the back of his shop with a two-track tape machine, working with Lee Perry who had just ended his association with Clement "Coxsone" Dodd. With the help of Bunny Lee, he launched his Amalgamated record label, and had his first success with one of the earliest rocksteady songs, Roy Shirley's "Hold Them", which topped the charts in Jamaica.

When Perry decided to leave to start his own record label, Upsetter, Gibbs enrolled the young Winston "Niney" Holness (later known as Niney The Observer) who helped Gibbs maintain his productions at the top of the charts. During the rocksteady period until 1970, he had hit records with numerous artists including The Pioneers, Errol Dunkley, and Ken Parker. He also worked with backing bands such as Lynn Taitt and the Jets (including the organist Ansel Collins, and horns players Tommy McCook, Johnny "Dizzy" Moore, Bobby Ellis and Vin Gordon), or The Hippy Boys (featuring the Barrett brothers as the rhythm section).

He concentrated exclusively on the production of the then new reggae sound after his first international success "Love of the Common People" by Nicky Thomas (#9 in the UK Singles Chart in summer 1970). Gibbs still recorded the rock-steady artists that he had initially worked with; artists like The Ethiopians, Delroy Wilson, and The Heptones. The two volumes of his singles compilations The Heptones and Friends were best-sellers in Jamaica. During this period, he launched three new labels —Jogib, Shock, and Pressure Beat.

In 1972, after having moved his studio in the Duhaney Park district, he set up a new one at Retirement Crescent in Kingston's Cross Roads district and started to work with sound engineer Errol Thompson, who used to be at Randy's Studio. Together they were known as "The Mighty Two", and along with his studio band The Professionals (including bassist Robbie Shakespeare, drummer Sly Dunbar and guitarist Earl "Chinna" Smith), they produced hundreds of singles, including the hits "Money in My Pocket" by Dennis Brown, "Ah So We Stay" by Big Youth and "Eviction" by Black Uhuru. The duo worked on over 100 Jamaican number one hits.

In 1975, he set up his new 16-track studio and record pressing plant at Retirement Crescent and kept producing Jamaican artists under numerous label names (Crazy Joe, Reflections, Belmont, Town & Country). He had success again with roots reggae, rockers, lovers rock and Dub music artists including: Dennis Brown, Jacob Miller, Sylford Walker, The Mighty Diamonds, Gregory Isaacs, Prince Alla and Junior Byles.

The 1977 Culture album Two Sevens Clash was a major influence on the then emerging punk scene and an internationally acclaimed production. The album was cited by punk rock band The Clash. Other successful artists produced by the Mighty Two during the end of the 1970s include: Marcia Aitken, Althea & Donna, John Holt, Barrington Levy, Cornell Campbell, Dean Fraser, Delroy Wilson, Beres Hammond, Ranking Joe, Prince Jazzbo, Prince Mohammed, Dillinger, Trinity, Prince Far I, Clint Eastwood, I-Roy and Kojak & Liza.

In the 1980s, Gibbs had an international hit with J.C. Lodge's "Someone Loves You Honey" and again in the 1990s–2000s teamed up with Errol Thompson, and Sydney "Luddy" Crooks of The Pioneers, to produce some new music way into the new millennium. Before his death, Gibbs also went into business with Chris Chin of VP Records, which was one of his last business ventures.

He was not married when he died of a heart attack on 22 February 2008 and is survived by his twelve children.

Discography

Albums
 Joe Gibbs – Dub Serial – 1972
 Joe Gibbs – African Dub All-Mighty – 1973
 Joe Gibbs – African Dub Chapter 2 – 1974
 Joe Gibbs – State of Emergency – 1976
 Joe Gibbs – African Dub All-Mighty Chapter 3 – 1978
 Joe Gibbs – African Dub Chapter 3 & 4 – 1978–1979
 Joe Gibbs & Professionals – African Dub Chapter 4 – 1979
 Joe Gibbs – Majestic Dub – 1979
 Joe Gibbs Family – Wish You A Merry Rockers Christmas – 1979
 Joe Gibbs – Rockers Carnival – 1980
 Joe Gibbs – Reggae Christmas – 1982
 Joe Gibbs – African Dub Chapter 5 – 1984

Singles
"Ten Feet Tall", 1970 reggae single by Joe Gibbs All Stars Pressure Beat 5508 A

Compilations
 Various Artists – Reggae Masterpiece Vol 01 – 1978 – Joe Gibbs
 Various Artists – Irie Reggae Hits – 1979 – Joe Gibbs
 Various Artists – Top Ranking DJ Session – 1979 – Joe Gibbs
 Various Artists – Shining Stars – 1983 – Joe Gibbs
 Various Artists – Best of Vintage – Joe Gibbs
 Various Artists – Explosive Rock Steady – 1967–1973 – Heartbeat Records (1991)
 Various Artists – The Mighty Two – Heartbeat Records (1992)
 Joe Gibbs & Friends – The Reggae Train 1968–1971 – Trojan Records (1988)
 Various Artists – Love of the Common People 1967–1979 – Trojan Records (2000)
 Various Artists – Uptown Top Ranking – 1970–1978 – Trojan Records (1998)
 Joe Gibbs & The Professionals feat. Errol Thompson – No Bones for the Dogs 1974–1979 – Pressure Sounds (2002)
 Various Artists – Joe Gibbs Productions – Soul Jazz Records (2003)
 Various Artists – Joe Gibbs Original DJ Classics – Rocky One
 Various Artists – Joe Gibbs Original DJ Classics Vol 02 – Rocky One
 Various Artists – Joe Gibbs Original DJ Classics Vol 03 – Rocky One
 Various Artists – Joe Gibbs Revive 45's Vol 01 – Rocky One
 Various Artists – Joe Gibbs Revive 45's Vol 02 – Rocky One
 Various Artists – Spotlight on Reggae Vol 01 – Rocky One
 Various Artists – Spotlight on Reggae Vol 02 – Rocky One
 Various Artists – Spotlight on Reggae Vol 03 – Rocky One
 Various Artists – Spotlight on Reggae Vol 04 – Rocky One
 Various Artists – Spotlight on Reggae Vol 06 – Rocky One
 Various Artists – Spotlight on Reggae Vol 07 – Rocky One
 Joe Gibbs – Scorchers From The Mighty Two – VP Records (2008)

References

External links
Joe Gibbs discography at Roots Archives
Joe Gibson and Joe Gibbs comprehensive singles discographies on 45cat.com

Jamaican record producers
1942 births
2008 deaths
People from Montego Bay
Jamaican reggae musicians